Françoise Arnoul (born Françoise Annette Marie Mathilde Gautsch; 3 June 1931 – 20 July 2021) was a French actress, who achieved popularity during the 1950s.

Early life
Born in Constantine, French Algeria, as the daughter of stage actress Janine Henry and artillery general Charles Gautsch, she had two brothers. While her father continued military service in Morocco, the rest of the family moved to Paris, France, in 1945.

Career
After learning drama in Paris, she was noticed by director Willy Rozier, who offered her a major role in the film L'Épave (1949).

Arnoul starred in such films as Henri Verneuil's Forbidden Fruit (1952), Jean Renoir's French Cancan (1954), People of No Importance (1956) with Jean Gabin, Henri Decoin's The Cat (1958), Way of Youth (1959) with Bourvil, and Jean Cocteau's Testament of Orpheus (1960).

Her American film debut came in Companions of the Night (1954).

Later in life, she moved into television, appearing in different TV movies and mini-series and also turning to character parts. She published her autobiography entitled Animal doué de bonheur in 1995.

Personal life
In 1956, Arnoul was married to publicity agent Georges Cravenne whom she had met two years previously, but they separated in 1960. From 1964, she became the companion of French director/scriptwriter Bernard Paul, a relationship which lasted until his death in 1980.

Arnoul died on 20 July 2021 in Paris, aged 90.

Selected filmography
 (1949)
 Quay of Grenelle (1950)
The Red Rose (1951)
 Mammy (1951)
 Love and Desire (1951)
Forbidden Fruit (1952)
Les Compagnes de la nuit (1953)
Dortoir des grandes (1953)
 Lovers of Toledo (1953)
La Rage au corps (1954)
Secrets d'alcôve (1954)
The Sheep Has Five Legs (1954)
French Cancan (1954)
The Lovers of Lisbon (1955)
Si Paris nous était conté (1956)
People of No Importance (1956)
Le Pays, d'où je viens (1956)
 Paris, Palace Hotel (1956)
No Sun in Venice (1957)
Thérèse Étienne (1958)
 The Cat (1958)
Asphalt (1959)
Way of Youth (1959)
Testament of Orpheus (1960)
 The Cat Shows Her Claws (1960)
Le Diable et les dix commandements (1962)
Portuguese Vacation (1963)
Lucky Jo (1964)
À couteaux tirés (1964)
The Sleeping Car Murders (1965)
 (1966)
Le dimanche de la vie (1967)
The Little Theatre of Jean Renoir (1970) (TV)
Spaniards in Paris (1971)
Dialogues of Exiles (1975)
Black-Out (1977)
 (1977)
 (1984)
Voir l'éléphant (1989)
Heavy Weather (1996)
Post Coitum, Animal Triste (1997)
Le Cancre (2016)

References

Bibliography
 Françoise Arnoul avec Jean-Louis Mingalon, Animal doué de bonheur, Éditions Belfond, Paris, 1995, .

External links

 
 
 
 Françoise Arnoul at DvdToile 
 Brief biography
 Cinematheque article

1931 births
2021 deaths
French film actresses
People from Constantine, Algeria
Pieds-Noirs
Commandeurs of the Ordre des Arts et des Lettres
Signatories of the 1971 Manifesto of the 343